Henry Leslie may refer to:

Henry Leslie (bishop) (1580–1661), Scottish bishop in the Church of Ireland
Henry Leslie (priest) (1775–1848), Dean of Connor
Henry David Leslie (1822–1896), English composer
Henry Leslie (playwright) (1830–1881), English actor and playwright
Sir (Henry John) Lindores Leslie, 9th Baronet (1920–1967) of the Leslie baronets

See also
Harry G. Leslie (1878–1937), Indiana Republican Party politician
Leslie (name)